"Tough Love" is a song by British singer Jessie Ware from her second studio album, Tough Love (2014). It was written by Ware, Benny Blanco, and Benjamin Ash and produced by the latter under the production pseudonym BenZel. The song was released in the United Kingdom as a digital download on 23 June 2014 as the lead single from the album. It peaked at number 34 on the UK Singles Chart, becoming Ware's first domestic top 40 entry. Critically acclaimed, "Tough Love" was included on  Pitchfork's list of the 100 best songs of 2014.

Music video
A music video to accompany the release of "Tough Love" was directed by BRTHR. It was first released onto YouTube on 9 July 2014 at a total length of three minutes and thirty seconds.

Track listing

Chart performance

Weekly charts

Release history

References

2014 singles
2014 songs
Jessie Ware songs
Island Records singles
Songs written by Benny Blanco
Songs written by Jessie Ware
Songs written by Two Inch Punch